Viktor Ponrepo (actual name Dismas Šlambor, 16 June 1858 Prague – December 1926 Prague) was a Czech magician and a pioneer of the cinema. He founded the first permanent cinema in Prague in Karlova ulice (Charles street).

His artist's surname is derived from the castle Bon Repos (French for good rest) near Stará Lysá.

The cinema of the Czech National Film Archive in Prague, Kino Ponrepo, is named after him.

Bibliography 
 BARTOŠEK, Luboš. Ponrepo. Od kouzelného divadla ke kinu. Praha: Orbis, 1957. 80 s.
 BARTOŠEK, Luboš. Náš film. Kapitoly z dějin (1896 – 1945). Praha: Mladá fronta, 1985. 424 s.
 KOLEKTIV AUTORŮ. Český hraný film I. 1898 – 1930. Praha: Národní filmový archiv, 1995. 285 s. .

References

External links 
 VIKTOR PONREPO - founder of the first permanent cinema in Prague on radio Prague
 Biography

Entertainers from Prague
1858 births
1926 deaths
Film directors from Prague